Evil Thoughts, (Italian title: Cattivi pensieri, also known as Who Mislaid My Wife?) is a 1976 Italian comedy film written, directed and starred by Ugo Tognazzi.

Plot 

The Milanese lawyer Mario Marani (Tognazzi), due to fog at the airport, is forced to return home because his flight was canceled. At home he finds his wife Francesca half asleep and realizes that a person is hiding in the closet of shotguns. 
Convinced that he is the lover of Francesca, he closes the utility room and the next morning he departs with his wife for work purposes, continuing to mull over the alleged infidelity of his wife.

Cast 
Ugo Tognazzi: Mario Marani
Edwige Fenech: Francesca Marani
Paolo Bonacelli: Antonio Marani
Piero Mazzarella: portinaio
Yanti Somer: Paola
Mara Venier: Miss Bocconi
Luc Merenda: Recrosio
Veruschka: lover of Mario
Laura Bonaparte: lover of Recrosio
Mircha Carven: Lorenzo Macchi
Orazio Orlando: lawyer Borderò 
Massimo Serato: Carlo Bocconi 
Pietro Brambilla: Duccio
Beppe Viola:  police commissioner 
Guido Nicheli: ospite
Riccardo Tognazzi: Gino

See also    
 List of Italian films of 1976

References

External links

1976 films
1970s Italian-language films
1976 comedy films
Films directed by Ugo Tognazzi
Films scored by Armando Trovajoli
Adultery in films
Italian comedy films
1970s Italian films